Tempter is the debut album by the Dutch death metal band Nembrionic Hammerdeath. It was released in 1993 as a split CD with Consolation's debut album Beautyfilth by Displeased Records. Later, it was re-issued by itself.

Track listing
  "Millionth Beast"  (3:50)  
  "Tempter"  (2:00)  
  "My Commitment"  (2:15)  
  "Yog Sothoth"  (3:47)  
  "Approach to Coincide"  (4:00)  
  "In Your Own Hell"  (4:01)  
  "Towards the Unholy (Thundermarch - Waterside - Towards - Token - Unholy - Endless - Purge)"  (11:50)

Credits
 Jamil Berud - Bass
 Dennis Jak - Guitar
 Noel Derek Rule Van Eersel - Drums
 Marco ("Bor") Westenbrink - Guitar, vocals

1993 debut albums
Nembrionic albums